The 2009 Internazionali Femminili di Palermo is a tennis tournament played on outdoor clay courts. It is the 22nd edition of the Internazionali Femminili di Palermo, and is part of the WTA International tournaments of the 2009 WTA Tour. It took place in Palermo, Italy, from July 13 through July 19, 2009.

WTA entrants

Seeds 

Seedings are based on the rankings of July 6, 2009.

Other entrants 
The following players received wildcards into the singles main draw

  Corinna Dentoni
  Nathalie Viérin
  Anna Floris

The following players received entry from the qualifying draw:
  Arantxa Parra Santonja
  Olga Savchuk
  Anastasia Pivovarova
  Arantxa Rus

Champions

Singles 

 Flavia Pennetta def.  Sara Errani 6–1, 6–2
It was Pennetta's first title of the year and 7th of her career.

Doubles 

 Nuria Llagostera Vives /  María José Martínez Sánchez def.  Mariya Koryttseva /  Darya Kustova, 6–1, 6–2

External links 
Official website

Internazionali Femminili di Palermo
Internazionali Femminili di Palermo
2009 in Italian women's sport
Torneo